Na Yun-su (born 20 August 1962) is a South Korean speed skater. He competed at the 1980 Winter Olympics and the 1984 Winter Olympics.

References

1962 births
Living people
South Korean male speed skaters
Olympic speed skaters of South Korea
Speed skaters at the 1980 Winter Olympics
Speed skaters at the 1984 Winter Olympics
Speed skaters from Seoul
Asian Games medalists in speed skating
Speed skaters at the 1986 Asian Winter Games
Medalists at the 1986 Asian Winter Games
Asian Games silver medalists for South Korea